The WaterLoo Pub, previously known as "Puutorin Vessa", is an English pub in the City of Turku, Finland. The circular building sits on the Puutori square, and it once served as a public restroom, hence the pun.

History
The building was completed in 1933 and it was designed by Totti Sora to serve as the weigh house for the bus station operating at the square. The building was open as a public restroom until 1986.

Markku Heikkilä and Kaija Väisänen renovated the building and it became a restaurant under the name "Puutorin Vessa". The restaurant opened on 6 June 1997 and it was operated by Heikkilä till 2007 and then by Lasse Laaksonen. The restaurant declared bankruptcy in 2014, when it was taken over by Tim Glogan, who opened it as the WaterLoo Pub.

At the end of 2018, Tim Glogan sold the business to Kenneth Forsström, owner of the Merihelmi Pub Boat on the River Aura. He reopened it in February 2019 under its original name, Puutorin Vessa.

References

External links
The WaterLoo Pub

Buildings and structures in Turku
Pubs in Turku
Tourist attractions in Turku